Princess Altinaï of Montenegro (born 27 October 1977) is the only daughter of Nicholas, Prince of Montenegro, head of the house of House of Petrović-Njegoš and his late wife, Francine Navarro. She was born in Les Lilas, France.

Education

Princess Altinaï was educated at the École nationale supérieure d'architecture de Paris-La Villette, Le Fresnoy - Studio National des Arts Contemporains, in Tourcoing, France, and San Antonio de los Baños' International School of Cinema and Television (EICTV) in Cuba.

She is a writer and director.

Marriage
On 12 May 2009, it was announced that Princess Altinaï married Russian violinist Anton Martynov. The couple has a son, Nikolai, born on 30 September 2009.

Titles and honours

Titles

 27 October 1977 – 23 March 1986: Her Highness Princess Altinaï of Montenegro
 24 March 1986 – present: Her Royal Highness Princess Altinaï of Montenegro

Honours
 Dame of the Order of Petrović Njegoš.
 Dame of the Order of Saint Peter of Cetinje.
 Dame Grand Cross of the Order of Prince Danilo I.
 Dame Grand Cross Order of Saints Maurice and Lazarus (Royal House of Savoy).
 Dame Grand Cross with the Crown in Ore of the House Order of the Wendish Crown.

Ancestors

References

External links

The Order of Prince Danilo I Official website of the Royal House of Montenegro and dynastic Orders.
Njegoskij|org :: The Royal House of Montenegro | News and media

1977 births
Living people
People from Les Lilas
Montenegrin princesses
Petrović-Njegoš dynasty